Daniel Bailey (born June 8, 1990) is an American college basketball coach and former player. He starred at Queens University of Charlotte, where he finished his career as the second all-time leading scorer and rebounder in school history.

Bailey founded the GameChangers Basketball Camp in his hometown of Columbia, South Carolina before getting involved as an Amateur Athletic Union (AAU) coach and skills development instructor. In April 2022, he accepted a role as an assistant coach at his alma mater.

References

External links
 Queens Royals bio
 Daniel Bailey at RealGM

1990 births
Living people
American expatriate basketball people in Finland
American expatriate basketball people in Germany
American expatriate basketball people in Japan
American expatriate basketball people in Romania
American men's basketball players
Basketball players from South Carolina
BC Nokia players
Crailsheim Merlins players
CSU Pitești players
KTP-Basket players
People from Irmo, South Carolina
Queens Royals men's basketball coaches
Queens Royals men's basketball players
Small forwards
Yokohama Excellence players